The Anglo-German Fellowship was a membership organisation that existed from 1935 to 1939, and aimed to build up friendship between the United Kingdom and Germany. It was widely perceived as being allied to Nazism. Previous groups in Britain with the same aims had been wound up when Adolf Hitler came to power.

Origins
In a 1935 speech, the Prince of Wales (later Edward VIII) had called for a closer understanding of Germany in order to safeguard peace in Europe, and in response Sir Thomas Moore, a Conservative Member of Parliament, suggested setting up a study group of pro-German MPs. From that idea emerged the AGF, established in September 1935 with Lord Mount Temple as chairman, and historian Philip Conwell-Evans and merchant banker Ernest Tennant as secretaries. Tennant was a friend of Joachim von Ribbentrop, German Ambassador to Britain. The group's stated aims were to foster political, professional, commercial and sporting links with Germany, but Mount Temple stated publicly that membership of the society did not assume support for Nazism or anti-Semitism.

An application was made to the Board of Trade on 26 July 1935 for "a licence directing an association about to be formed under the name of The Anglo-German Fellowship". The objectives of the proposed association were given as:

Membership
The organisation was aimed at the influential in society, and the membership was dominated by businessmen keen to promote commercial links. Members included Bank of England director Frank Cyril Tiarks, Admiral Sir Barry Domvile, Prince von Bismarck, Governor of the Bank of England Montagu Norman, Geoffrey Dawson editor of The Times. "Corporate membership" was also available for leading companies who wished to show their support for co-operation with Germany and this was taken out by such leading organisations as Price Waterhouse, Unilever, Dunlop Rubber, Thomas Cook & Son, the Midland Bank and Lazard Brothers amongst others.

Several Members of Parliament, mostly from the Conservative Party, joined the group: they included Sir Peter Agnew, Lawrence Dundas, 2nd Marquess of Zetland, Ernest Bennett, Sir Robert Bird, Robert Tatton Bower, Douglas Douglas-Hamilton, Marquess of Clydesdale, Robert Vaughan Gower, Thomas "Loel" Guinness, Norman Hulbert, Archibald James, Alfred Knox, John Macnamara, Sir Thomas Moore, Assheton Pownall, Frank Sanderson, Duncan Sandys, Admiral Murray Sueter, Charles Taylor and Ronald Tree. Members of the House of Lords to hold membership included Lord Brocket, Lord Galloway, the Earl of Glasgow, Lord Mount Temple, Lord Londonderry, Lord Nuffield, Lord Redesdale, Lord Rennell and the Duke of Wellington.

By 1937, the group seems to have had 347 members.

Activities
The AGF's sister organization in Berlin was the Deutsch-Englische Gesellschaft. Neither group had an avowed mission to Nazify Britain. Instead, the two groups would unite, to host grand dinners at which leading German figures noted for their Anglophilia or their familial links to the United Kingdom, such as Rudolf Hess, von Ribbentrop, General Werner von Blomberg, the Duke of Brunswick and the Duke of Saxe-Coburg and Gotha, would be guests of honour.

However, the organisation did have a pro-Nazi leaning, as well as a number of fascist members. The spies Guy Burgess and Kim Philby, seeking to disguise their Communist affiliations, joined the AGF in the knowledge that it was widely perceived as allied to the far right.

Reaction to Nazi antisemitism 

Lord Mount Temple resigned in November 1938 as chairman of the AGF because of the treatment of the German Jews by the Nazis. Following his resignation he told the press:

The Council of the Anglo-German Fellowship met in London and released a statement:

Closure 
At the time of the Munich Crisis in 1938 Ernest Tennant recorded that the feeling in the organisation was that they should close. However, they approached the UK Foreign Office for advice. Tennant reported that Lord Vansittart recommended their staying active, which they did until the outbreak of the Second World War.

However, this claim was later refuted by Vansittart. He responded that he queried the claim with the intermediary between the Fellowship and the Foreign Office, Conwell Evans, who reported that he had met with Lord Halifax on the matter.

In the House of Commons on 7 September 1939 Vyvyan Adams MP asked the Home Secretary what the Government is doing to "deal with" organisations such as the Fellowship. To this, Sir John Anderson reported to the house that "the Anglo-German Fellowship has entirely suspended its activities".

See also 
Germany–United Kingdom relations
Deutsch-Englische Gesellschaft
The Link (UK organization)
Anglo-German Friendship Committee, founded 1905

References

Organizations established in 1935
Organizations disestablished in 1939
Germany–United Kingdom relations
Far-right politics in the United Kingdom
United Kingdom friendship associations
Germany friendship associations
1935 establishments in Germany
1939 disestablishments in Germany
1935 establishments in the United Kingdom
1939 disestablishments in the United Kingdom